Spielberk Towers are two high-rises in Brno, Czech Republic. The towers are part of the complex Spielberk Office Centre. The towers are named as Tower A and Tower B. The lower tower is named Tower A and the taller tower is named Tower B. The Tower A is 53 metres high and the taller Tower B is 85 metres high. The taller tower has 21 floors above ground and 3 floors below ground. The building has received a BREEAM Outstanding certificate.

The construction of the building started in 2007, but it was stopped because of the financial crisis. The construction was restored in June 2010. The Tower B was completed in 2012. The Tower A is used as a hotel. The Tower B had been the tallest building in Brno before the AZ Tower was built in 2013.

Gallery

References

External links 
 Spielberk Office Centre website
 
 
 

Skyscraper office buildings in the Czech Republic
Buildings and structures in Brno
Skyscrapers in the Czech Republic
Skyscraper hotels
Office buildings completed in 2012
2012 establishments in the Czech Republic
21st-century architecture in the Czech Republic